Melaka Monorail is a monorail system in Malacca City, Malacca, Malaysia with 3 stations – Tun Ali, Hang Tuah and Hang Jebat. Only the Tun Ali station is currently operational, while 2 other stations (Hang Tuah and Hang Jebat) are all closed until further notice.

The first phase of the system, built at a cost of RM15.9 million and covering 1.6 km from Taman Rempah in Pengkalan Rama to Hang Tuah Station at Kampung Bunga Raya Pantai, was opened to the public on 21 October 2010.  However, hours after opening, the monorail ground to a halt, stranding 20 passengers inside. , after a series of similar problems it was no longer operational; the monorail was however spotted at nights doing test runs in 2011.
In March 2016 it was still inoperative, although in June 2015 there were reports about Malacca state government planning to restore dilapidated infrastructure and to revive the monorail service in order to promote tourism in the area.

After 4 years being suspended since 2013 due to technical problems, the Melaka Monorail service begin operating again on 4 December 2017. The service would operate from 10am to 10pm on weekdays, with extended service till midnight on weekends and currently, only one coach which can accommodate up to 15 people will travel each round which will take 30 minutes. The tickets sold at RM10 each.

The Melaka Monorail is now a complete uni-directional clockwise loop covering 2.5 km starting from Tun Ali Station, crossing the Malacca River plying parallel to Jalan Tun Mutahir, bypassing Hang Tuah Station, running parallel south on the west side of the Malacca River, bypassing Hang Jebat Station, crossing the Malacca River again, running parallel to Jalan Tun Ali, and returning to Tun Ali Station.

See also 
 List of monorail systems
 KL Monorail

References 

Monorails
Rail transport in Melaka
Monorails in Malaysia
Malacca City
Railway lines opened in 2010
2010 establishments in Malaysia